Kalleh Jub-e Hajj Ali (also Romanized as Kalleh Jūb-e Hājj ʿAlī; also known as Kaleh Jūb and Kalleh Jūb-e Chaghalvandī) is a village in Beyranvand-e Jonubi Rural District, Bayravand District, Khorramabad County, Lorestan Province, Iran. At the 2006 census, its population was 31, in 7 families.

References 

Towns and villages in Khorramabad County